Bradley Park may refer to:
Laura Bradley Park, a park in Peoria, Illinois, United States
Bradley Park, an area of Neptune Township, New Jersey, United States
Bradley Park, a housing estate in Nunsthorpe, Grimsby, England
Bradley Park, a park in Bradley, Huddersfield, England

See also
Bradley Park Rangers F.C. (1951-1965), a Welsh  football team from Bradley, Wrexham, Wales